My Beautiful Bride is a South Korean television series starring Kim Mu-yeol, Lee Si-young, Ko Sung-hee, Ryu Seung-soo, Park Hae-joon. The series aired on OCN every Saturday and Sunday at 22:20 (KST) from June 20 to August 9, 2015.

Synopsis 
A desperate love story about a man who pushes himself to the bitter end of the world to reclaim his beloved bride.

Cast

Main
 Kim Mu-yeol as Kim Do-hyung
 Lee Si-young as Cha Yoon-mi
 Ko Sung-hee Yoon Joo-young / Yoon Joo-hee
 Ryu Seung-soo as Seo Jin-ki / Lee Ki-soo
 Park Hae-joon as Park Hyung-sik

Supporting
 Choi Byung-mo as Secretary Kim
 Son Jong-hak as Director Kang
 Lee Jae-yong as Song Hak-soo
 Lee Seung-yun as Lee Jin-sook
 Kim Bo-yun as Moon In-sook
 Han Sung-yun as Cha Yoon-mi
 Jo Han-chul as Park Tae-kyu
 Kim Sung-hoon as Shim Han-joo
 Park Hyun-woo as Kim Myung-hwan
 Lee Sun-ah as Oh Jung-yeon
 Park In-bae as Janggab (grove)
 Yoon Jin-ho as Lee Jang-ho
 Lee El as Son Hye-jung
 Shim Min as Kang Jung-hwa
 Kim Ye-ryeong as Joo-young's mother
 Park Soo-young as President Jo
 Lee Kyu-bok as Yoon Min-soo (Joo Young's older brother)
 Song Yi-woo as Min-soo's wife
 Park Kwang-jae
 Kim Min-sang
 Brian Joo
 Lee Moo-saeng as Do-hyung's lawyer

Ratings
 In this table,  represent the lowest ratings and  represent the highest ratings.

References

External links 
  

OCN television dramas
Korean-language television shows
2015 South Korean television series debuts
2015 South Korean television series endings
Television series by Doremi Entertainment